The Jamaica Defence Force (JDF) is the combined military of Jamaica, consisting of an infantry Regiment and Reserve Corps, an Air Wing, a Coast Guard fleet and a supporting Engineering Unit. The JDF is based upon the British military model, with similar organisation, training, weapons and traditions. Once chosen, officer candidates are sent to one of several British or Canadian basic officer courses depending upon the arm of service. Enlisted soldiers are given basic training at JDF Training Depot Newcastle. As in the British model, NCOs are given several levels of professional training as they rise up the ranks. Additional military schools are available for speciality training in Canada, the United Kingdom, and the United States.

History

The JDF is directly descended from the West India Regiments formed during the period of British rule. The regiments were used extensively by the British to garrison the Colony of Jamaica and possessions in the West Indies. Other units in the JDF heritage tree include the early colonial Jamaica Militia, the Kingston Infantry Volunteers of WWI and reorganised into the Jamaican Infantry Volunteers in WWII. The West India Regiments were reformed in 1958 as part of the West Indies Federation. The dissolution of the Federation resulted in the establishment of the JDF.

The Jamaica Defence Force (JDF) comprises an infantry Regiment and Reserve Corps, an Air Wing, a Coast Guard fleet and a supporting Engineering Unit. The infantry regiment contains the 1st, 2nd and 3rd (National Reserve) battalions. The JDF Air Wing is divided into three flight units, a training unit, a support unit and the JDF Air Wing (National Reserve). The Coast Guard element is divided between seagoing crews and support crews. It conducts maritime safety and maritime law enforcement as well as defence-related operations. The support battalion contains a Military Police platoon as well as vehicle, armourers and supply units. The 1st Engineer Regiment provides military engineering support to the JDF. The Headquarters JDF contains the JDF commander, command staff as well as intelligence, judge advocate office, administrative and procurement sections.

On 5 January 1978, the JDF carried out a covert operation that came to be known as the Green Bay Massacre, in which five Jamaica Labour Party (JLF) supporters were shot dead after being lured to a military shooting range. A specially selected team of snipers led by Major Ian Robinson laid an ambush outside the range while members of the JDF's Military Intelligence Unit (MIU) drove a group of JLF supporters towards them in an army ambulance. After the supporters exited the ambulance, an MIU soldier killed one member while the sniper team opened fire on the rest. Four supporters were killed and the remainder fled into nearby bushes.

In recent years the JDF has been called upon to assist the nation's police, the Jamaica Constabulary Force (JCF), in fighting drug smuggling and a rising crime rate which includes one of the highest murder rates in the world. JDF units actively conduct armed patrols with the JCF in high-crime areas and known gang neighbourhoods. There has been vocal controversy as well as support of this JDF role. In early 2005, an opposition leader, Edward Seaga, called for the merger of the JDF and JCF. This move did not garner support in either organisation nor among the majority of citizens.

Major units of the Jamaica Defence Force

Headquarters, Jamaica Defence Force (HQ JDF) - divided into the Operations Branch and Adjutant Quartermaster's Branch, this is the main command of the entire JDF.
The Jamaica Regiment - The Jamaica Regiment is the operationalization of a terrestrial and combat focused Regular Force formation with an overarching operational headquarters in command of five battalions; the First, Second, Fourth and Fifth Battalions the Jamaica Regiment (1, 2, 4, 5 JR) and the Combat Support Battalion (Cbt Sp Bn).
The Support Brigade (Sp Bde): Regular Force formation that provides both combat support and service support functions with an overarching operational headquarters for five units:
Directorate of Training and Doctrine 
1st Engineer Regiment 
Support and Services Battalion 
Military Police Battalion 
Health Services Corps
The Maritime, Air and Cyber Command (MACC) - The Maritime, Air and Cyber Command (MACC) is a multi-domain focused Regular Force formation with an operational headquarters in command of six units; the First and Second Districts Jamaica Defence Force Coast Guard (1stand 2ndDist JDF CG), the Jamaica Defence Force Air Wing (JDF AW), the Military Intelligence Unit (MIU), the Special Activities Regiment (SPEAR) and the Military Cyber Corps (MCC).
The Jamaica National Reserve (JNR) - The Jamaica National Reserve (JNR) is a multi-domain focused Reserve Force formation that has been expanded to include a headquarters element in command of four units; the Third, Sixth and Ninth Battalions the Jamaica Regiment (3, 6 and 9 JR (NR)) in addition to the Support Battalion (National Reserve) (Sp Bn (NR).
The Jamaica National Service Corps (JNSC) - The Jamaica National Service Corps (JNSC) is the newest category of service in the JDF. It was designed to instill positive values and attitudes, whilst providing young men and women with a range of life skills in order to make them better equipped for success in their chosen career path; which may on completion include service in the JDF.

Bands
The JDF also supports two military bands;

Jamaica Military Band - this is the band that is descended from the band of the West India Regiment, and was formed in February 1927. It is one of only two units in the world (the other being the Band of the Barbados Regiment) that wears the uniform of the zouaves.
Jamaica Regiment Band - this band was originally formed as the Band of the West India Regiment formed in 1959 as the military force of the Federation of the West Indies. With the Federation's break up and the independence of Jamaica, it became the Band of the 1st Battalion, Jamaica Regiment. It gained its current name with the formation of the 2nd Battalion in 1979.

Army equipment

JDF Air Wing

Current inventory

Retired
Previous aircraft operated by the Air Force consisted of the Aero Commander 500 family, BN-2 Islander, Beechcraft Duke, Beechcraft King Air, Cessna Skymaster, Cessna 185 Skywagon, Cessna 210, DHC-6 Twin Otter, Eurocopter AS355 Écureuil 2, Bell UH-1 Iroquois, Bell 47G, Bell 212, Bell 204/205, and the Bell 222UT helicopter

Incidents
On July 1, 2009, a Jamaica Defence Force Air Wing Bell 412EP helicopter was on its way back to Up Park Camp from a training mission when it began experiencing mechanical issues. The helicopter crashed into the ground at Up Park Camp, injuring the captain, his co-pilot and a crew member.

JDF Coast Guard

A year after the JDF was formed in 1962, a naval arm, the Jamaica Sea Squadron was added. The squadron’s initial vessels were three 63 ft wooden World War II torpedo recovery boats provided by the United States. They were commissioned “Her Majesty’s Jamaican Ship” HMJS Yoruba (P1), HMJS Coromante (P2) and HMJS Mandingo (P3). A training team from the Royal Navy assisted with the unit’s early development. In 1966 they changed names from the Jamaica Sea Squadron to the Jamaica Defence Force Coast Guard.

As of 2016, the Jamaica Defence Force Coast Guard was staffed by 241 individuals.

Equipment

Ranks of the JDF

Commissioned officers
The rank insignia for commissioned officers for the army and Coast Guard respectively.

Enlisted
The rank insignia for enlisted personnel for the army and Coast Guard respectively.

See also
 Green Bay Massacre

References

Citations

Bibliography

External links

Military of Jamaica